Myrmecoxenus may refer to:
 Myrmecoxenus, a genus of arachnids in the family Linyphiidae; synonym of Myrmecomelix
 Myrmecoxenus, a genus of beetles in the family Tenebrionidae; synonym of Myrmechixenus